Xenodiscula taintori is a species of air-breathing land snail, a gastropod in the family Sagdidae. This species is found in Guatemala and Nicaragua.

Sources 

Xenodiscula
Molluscs of Central America
Gastropods described in 1937
Taxonomy articles created by Polbot